Scarlet Seas is a surviving 1929 American silent romantic adventure film produced by Richard A. Rowland and distributed by First National Pictures. The picture was directed by John Francis Dillon. It starred Richard Barthelmess, Betty Compson, and a teen-aged Loretta Young. This film was released with a Vitaphone soundtrack of music and effects which survive. Originally, the film was presumed lost.

The story was written by W. Scott Darling.

Cast
Richard Barthelmess as Steven Dunkin
Betty Compson as Rose
Loretta Young as Margaret Barbour
James Bradbury Sr. as Johnson
Jack Curtis as Toomey
Knute Erickson as Captain Barbour

uncredited
Shorty English as Sailor

Critical reception
A review in Harrison's Reports found that the film contains "offenses to logic", including the nimbleness of the hero and heroine as they climb a rope ladder despite having survived days of hunger and thirst and the way the hero easily overcomes "a giant", lifts him, and throws him overboard.

Preservation status
The film was long thought to be lost. A print has been discovered in Italy at Cineteca Italiana.

References

External links

Scarlet Seas at silentera.com
Lobby posters of the film: #1,...#2
Southseascinema.org a website devoted to island themed films
Surviving Vitaphone track samples: #1, #2, #3, #4, #5
 Vitaphone Soundtrack Collection

1928 films
American silent feature films
First National Pictures films
Films directed by John Francis Dillon
1920s adventure films
American adventure films
American black-and-white films
1920s rediscovered films
Seafaring films
1920s romance films
American romance films
Rediscovered American films
1920s American films
Silent adventure films